Phelsuma ravenala is a species of gecko. It is endemic to Madagascar, where it is found in the regions of Vatovavy-Fitovinany, Atsinanana and Analanjirofo.

Etymology
The species name was given in reference to the plant it was discovered on, Ravenala madagascariensis.

References

Phelsuma
Endemic fauna of Madagascar
Reptiles of Madagascar
Reptiles described in 2007